Charles Frank Reavis (September 5, 1870 – May 26, 1932) was an American Republican Party politician.

He was born in Falls City, Nebraska on and studied law at Northwestern University in Evanston, Illinois. He was admitted to the bar in 1892 and set up practice in Falls City.  He became the prosecuting attorney of Richardson County, Nebraska from 1894 to 1896.

In 1915 he was elected to the Sixty-fourth United States Congress and reelected to the three succeeding congresses serving from March 4, 1915, to June 3, 1922. On April 5, 1917, he voted against declaring war on Germany. He resigned in 1922 and was appointed in June 1922 special assistant to the United States Attorney General in the prosecution of war fraud cases. He served until June 1, 1924. He moved to Lincoln, Nebraska in 1924 and continued the practice of law. He died there on May 26, 1932, and is buried in Steele Cemetery in Falls City.

References
 
 
 
 
 

1870 births
1939 deaths
People from Falls City, Nebraska
Politicians from Lincoln, Nebraska
District attorneys in Nebraska
Republican Party members of the United States House of Representatives from Nebraska